Cody Jamieson (born July 17, 1987) is a Mohawk lacrosse player from the Turtle Clan at Grand River. He plays for the Halifax Thunderbirds of the National Lacrosse League, the New York Lizards of Major League Lacrosse, and the Six Nations Chiefs in Major Series Lacrosse. Jamieson is a former attackman for Syracuse University, where he obtained a degree in Communications.

National Lacrosse League
Jamieson was selected first overall by the Rochester Knighthawks in the 2010 NLL draft. He had 53 points in his rookie season and finished second to Curtis Dickson in the Rookie of the Year voting. Jamieson became the de facto offensive leader of the Knighthawks in his second season, leading the team with 36 goals and 85 points as the Knighthawks captured their third Champion's Cup. Jamieson, with four goals and four assists, was named Championship Game MVP.

A year later, Jamieson won the scoring title with 108 points and 72 assists.  He led the Knighthawks to their third straight Championship, making them second in the NLL and top of their Eastern Division. His hard work and achievements were recognized and he was named league MVP in 2014.

Canadian Box career

Junior
During Jamieson's tenure with the Six Nations Arrows Express of the OLA Junior A Lacrosse League, he would help the team to four straight league championships. In 2007, Jamieson would lead an all-star team, which included future NLL players Sid Smith, Shawn Evans and Craig Point, to Six Nations' first Minto Cup national championship in 15 years. Jamieson was also awarded the "Jim McConaghy Memorial Cup" as Series M.V.P.

Jamieson had his best season yet the following year. Jamieson would lead the league in scoring with a career high 59 goals and 101 points, and was awarded the "Green Gael Trophy" as league M.V.P. He was also given the "Jim Veltman Award" as the league's Most Outstanding Player.

Jamieson finished his outstanding junior career with 199 goals and 395 points, as well as 141 goals and 251 points in the playoffs. He is currently ranked 24th all time in goals (regular season and playoffs combined) in Canadian junior lacrosse history with 340.

Senior
Jamieson scored 48 goals and 96 points during his first season of senior lacrosse with the Six Nations Chiefs. Jamieson became the first player in Major Series Lacrosse history to lead the league in scoring, win the Rookie of the Year and the Most Valuable Player awards all in his rookie season.

College career

Onondaga Community College
Jamieson began his college career at Onondaga Community College. He began here to get his academic record up to par as to attend Syracuse University and play Division 1 NCAA. During his first year, Jamieson led the Lazers (which included fellow Six Nations players Craig Point and Sid Smith) to an 18-0 undefeated season and a national championship. Jamieson finished his first season second in the league scoring with 57 goals and 121 points.

In 2007, Jamieson led the nation in goals (65), assists (51), and points (116) on the way to a second consecutive undefeated season and national championship. In the 2007 championship game, Jamieson scored 9 goals, and was awarded game M.V.P. honours for a second year in a row. He was named an NJCAA first-team All-American and the NJCAA Offensive Player of the Year.

During the last year of his lacrosse career at Onondaga Community College he received the Tom Longboat Award, given to Canada's top aboriginal athletes. This made him the second lacrosse player from Six Nations to receive this accolade. His career at the college also left a legacy as in 2014 he was added to the college's Alumni Faces display, which stands to recognize alumni for their achievements and contributions to the community.

Syracuse University
Jamieson transferred to Syracuse in 2008. However, due to academic reasons, Jamieson was not allowed to play until the last few games of the 2009 season. Jamieson played with the Orange during the 2009 NCAA Division I Men's Lacrosse Championship. Syracuse advanced to the championship game. In sudden death overtime of the championship game, Jamieson scored the game-winning goal to give Syracuse their second national championship in a row. He was named to the NCAA championship All-Tournament team after scoring 8 goals in 6 games.

He obtained from his academic career an undergraduate degree in Communications. As the first in his family to achieve a degree in post secondary education, he plans to use his education to help more indigenous youth make it to post secondary education through lacrosse programs.

Personal life

Suicide Prevention Workshops 
Lacrosse is deeply rooted in Mohawk culture as it is described in their creation story and is the center of many cultural practices. Using the games significance Jamieson saw an opportunity to tackle an issue ravaging indigenous communities, suicide among indigenous youth. Using lacrosse as a basis he created suicide prevention workshops in his community, allowing a way for youth to not only let out pent up emotions but also more importantly to connect with their culture in a meaningful way.

Statistics

Junior

Senior

Awards

References

External links
 Bio from Syracuse University web site

1987 births
Living people
Canadian Mohawk people
Lacrosse people from Ontario
First Nations sportspeople
Halifax Thunderbirds players
Iroquois nations lacrosse players
Lacrosse forwards
Major League Lacrosse players
Native American sportspeople
National Lacrosse League players
New York Lizards players
Onondaga Lazers athletes
Rochester Knighthawks players
Six Nations of the Grand River
Syracuse Orange men's lacrosse players
Competitors at the 2022 World Games